Vyšné Nemecké is a small village in the Sobrance District, Košice Region, right on the Slovak side of the main international road border with Ukraine, opposite the city of Uzhhorod. As of 2011 it had 245 inhabitants.

References

External links

http://en.e-obce.sk/obec/vysnenemecke/vysne-nemecke.html
http://www.vysnenemecke.sk

Slovakia–Ukraine border crossings